Lago di Livigno or Lago del Gallo is a reservoir in the Livigno valley. The reservoir is mostly in Italy whereas the Punt dal Gall arch dam is crossed by the border with Switzerland (Zernez, Grisons).

The reservoir's surface area is 4.71 km².

The reservoir has a capacity of 164 million m³. Its minimum and maximum water levels above sea level are at 1,700 metres and 1,805 metres respectively. Since its construction, this reservoir had been off-limits for any activity, such as wind-surfing or rowing, until the summer of 2005, when Italy's National Rowing team was authorized to train on the lake.

See also
List of lakes of Switzerland
List of mountain lakes of Switzerland

External links

Livigno
Livigno
Livigno
Italy–Switzerland border
Livigno
Livigno
Zernez